Foss House may refer to:

Horatio G. Foss House, Auburn, Maine
Levi Foss House, Goodwins Mills, Maine
Foss and Wells House, Jordan, Minnesota
Foss House (New Brighton, Minnesota)